Lipnički Šor is a town in the municipality of Loznica, Serbia. According to the 2002 census, the town has a population of 2673 people.

References

Populated places in Mačva District